Lewis Wormser Harris (1812–1876) was an Irish bill-broker, financier, member of the Dublin Corporation and prominent member of the Dublin Hebrew Congregation. He was the first Jew elected Lord Mayor of Dublin, but died before he could take office.

Background
Harris was born Samuel Wormser on 5 April 1812, to Isaac Samuel Wormser and Sheinle Ephraim, in Aldingen, near Stuttgart, Germany.  He moved to Ireland in 1821, living in the residence of a Charles Harris, a watchmaker, and soon after adopted the surname Harris. He operated very successfully as a financier with offices in Suffolk Street, Dublin.

Political career
In 1874, he was elected Alderman of Dublin Corporation representing the South Dock Ward, the first member of Dublin's Jewish community to hold such a position. In 1876 he was the first Jew elected as Lord Mayor; however, he died just before he was due to take up the office.

Jewish community
On three occasions he was President of the Dublin Hebrew Congregation: 1847-48, 1851–52, and 1860–63. In 1853, he was involved in the foundation of the synagogue in Stafford Street.

Family
Lewis was married twice, first to Caroline Ellen Picard (1817-1855). She was born Hendel b. Raphael Picard in Strasbourg, France. They married in 1836 and had four children: Alfred, Hannah (Annie), Morris (Moshe) and Raphael.

After his first wife's death, Lewis married Juliette Joseph (1821-1908) in 1857 with whom he had five children: Herbert, Ernest, Lionel Simon, Arthur and Walter. Juliette died in Brighton in 1908 and was interred at Ballybough Cemetery, Dublin, one of the last people to be buried at that cemetery.

Lewis' son Alfred Wormser Harris was also elected an Alderman for Dublin Corporation and like his father was President of the Dublin Hebrew Congregation from 1867 to 1873. In 1880 Alfred stood for election in Kildare as a Liberal.

Death
Harris died on 1 August 1876 in Bray, County Wicklow.

References

1812 births
1876 deaths
German emigrants to Ireland
Irish Jews
Irish people of German-Jewish descent
Lord Mayors of Dublin